Albert, Alby or Bert Roberts may refer to:

Politicians
Albert H. Roberts (1868–1946), American politician who served as Governor of Tennessee
Albert Roberts (British politician) (1908–2000), English MP for Normanton in West Yorkshire

Sports competitors
Bert Roberts, English rugby footballer (1914–15 Northern Rugby Football Union season#Challenge Cup)
Alby Roberts (1909–1978), New Zealand Test cricketer

Others
Bert Roberts (1878–1964), Australian coachbuilder with interest in photography
Bert Roberts, Australian Laureate Fellow (List of University of Wollongong people#Staff)
Bert Roberts, American business executive (David Gorodyansky#Influence and Internet Philosophy)

See also
Bartholomew Roberts (1682–1722), Welsh pirate notorious as "Black Bart" 
Bart Roberts, early stage name of American actor Rex Reason (1928–2015)
Robert Alberts (born 1954), Dutch footballer and manager